Jerry V. Davis is a Texas politician that represented Houston City Council District B from 2012 to 2020. He also ran for the Texas House of Representatives in 2020, but was defeated in the primary.

Personal life
In 1995, Davis graduated from Washington College with a BA and later earned his teaching certificate from the University of St. Thomas. He then worked for Houston area schools as a coach. While working as a coach, he attended Prairie View A&M University and earned a Masters in Education Administration. Additionally, with his older brothers, Davis owns 3 restaurants, the Breakfast Klub, the Reggae Hut, and the Alley Kat Bar & Lounge. He is married to Rachel Andress and has 3 children, Dean, Rylie and, Ryan.

Political career
Davis is affiliated with the Democratic Party.

Houston City Council
He assumed office to represent District B of the Houston City Council in 2012. While on the council, he was co-sponsor of the Council District Service Fund (CDSF), which allows district council members to fund local projects in the districts they represent. He was a strong supporter of the 2012 Parks bond, which increased the cities funding into public parks. Additionally, he was appointed by his fellow council members to be mayor pro-tempore and has served the position for 2 terms. Davis was term limited on the council, in spite of this until District B held an election for a new representative Davis held the position. On December 21, 2020, Davis was succeeded by Tarsha Jackson.

Texas House of Representatives
In December 2019, Davis filed as a Democrat to run for district 142 of the Texas House of Representatives challenging incumbent Harold Dutton Jr. He was runner-up to Dutton Jr. in the Democratic primary.

References

Living people
1970s births
Houston City Council members
Texas Democrats
Prairie View A&M University alumni
Washington College alumni
University of St. Thomas (Texas) alumni